Mahmutbey Mosque is a historical mosque in Kasaba  village in Kastamonu Province, Turkey.

Kasaba was once an important settlement in Kastamonu Province.

The mosque
It was commissioned by Mahmut Bey, a member of Candarid house in 1366. The mosque is unique in its building technique for no cement is used in the construction,  except for the mihrab. The roof too was constructed without using any metal element. In fact, it is also known as Çivisiz camii meaning "mosque without nails".The plan of the mosque is rectangular. It is one of the first wood columned and wood roofed mosques in Anatolia. The exterior of mosque was constructed by hewn stone. Ceiling of the building stands on four pillars. Inside the mosque, all the wood surfaces are decorated with vegetal paint colored ornaments.The portal of the mosque, which was a masterpiece of art. It is now kept in the Kastamonu Ethnography Museum. A replica of the original portal has been mounted in place.

World Heritage Site status
The mosque was added to the tentative list in the cultural category of UNESCO World Heritage Site on April 15, 2014.

Gallery

References

History of Kastamonu Province
Tourist attractions in Kastamonu Province
Religious buildings and structures completed in 1366
World Heritage Tentative List for Turkey
Mosques in Kastamonu
Candaroğlu
Ottoman mosques in Turkey